In the geometry of hyperbolic 3-space, the order-3-4 heptagonal honeycomb or 7,3,4 honeycomb a regular space-filling tessellation (or honeycomb). Each infinite cell consists of a heptagonal tiling whose vertices lie on a 2-hypercycle, each of which has a limiting circle on the ideal sphere.

Geometry 
The Schläfli symbol of the order-3-4 heptagonal honeycomb is {7,3,4}, with four heptagonal tilings meeting at each edge.  The vertex figure of this honeycomb is an octahedron, {3,4}.

Related polytopes and honeycombs 
It is a part of a series of regular polytopes and honeycombs with {p,3,4} Schläfli symbol, and octahedral vertex figures:

Order-3-4 octagonal honeycomb

In the geometry of hyperbolic 3-space, the order-3-4 octagonal honeycomb or 8,3,4 honeycomb a regular space-filling tessellation (or honeycomb). Each infinite cell consists of an octagonal tiling whose vertices lie on a 2-hypercycle, each of which has a limiting circle on the ideal sphere.

The Schläfli symbol of the order-3-4 octagonal honeycomb is {8,3,4}, with four octagonal tilings meeting at each edge. The vertex figure of this honeycomb is an octahedron, {3,4}.

Order-3-4 apeirogonal honeycomb

In the geometry of hyperbolic 3-space, the order-3-4 apeirogonal honeycomb or ∞,3,4 honeycomb a regular space-filling tessellation (or honeycomb). Each infinite cell consists of an order-3 apeirogonal tiling whose vertices lie on a 2-hypercycle, each of which has a limiting circle on the ideal sphere.

The Schläfli symbol of the order-3-4 apeirogonal honeycomb is {∞,3,4}, with four order-3 apeirogonal tilings meeting at each edge.  The vertex figure of this honeycomb is an octahedron, {3,4}.

See also 
 Convex uniform honeycombs in hyperbolic space
 List of regular polytopes

References 

Coxeter, Regular Polytopes, 3rd. ed., Dover Publications, 1973. . (Tables I and II: Regular polytopes and honeycombs, pp. 294–296)
 The Beauty of Geometry: Twelve Essays (1999), Dover Publications,  (Chapter 10, Regular Honeycombs in Hyperbolic Space) Table III
 Jeffrey R. Weeks The Shape of Space, 2nd edition  (Chapters 16–17: Geometries on Three-manifolds I,II)
 George Maxwell, Sphere Packings and Hyperbolic Reflection Groups, JOURNAL OF ALGEBRA 79,78-97 (1982) 
 Hao Chen, Jean-Philippe Labbé, Lorentzian Coxeter groups and Boyd-Maxwell ball packings, (2013)
 Visualizing Hyperbolic Honeycombs arXiv:1511.02851 Roice Nelson, Henry Segerman (2015)

External links 
John Baez, Visual insights: {7,3,3} Honeycomb (2014/08/01) {7,3,3} Honeycomb Meets Plane at Infinity (2014/08/14) 
 Danny Calegari, Kleinian, a tool for visualizing Kleinian groups, Geometry and the Imagination 4 March 2014. 

Honeycombs (geometry)
Heptagonal tilings
Isogonal 3-honeycombs
Isochoric 3-honeycombs
Order-3-n 3-honeycombs
Order-n-4 3-honeycombs
Regular 3-honeycombs